Hockey Club Milano was an Italian ice hockey team based in Milan. Throughout its history, the team has changed its name twice. It was previously called Associazione Disco Ghiaccio Milano and Hockey Club Milano Inter.

The club was founded in 1924 and finally folded in 1956.

They were one of founder members of the Campionato italiano di hockey su ghiaccio and were its first champion, in 1925.

Club Names

Hockey Club Milano: 1924–1936, 1946–1950.
Associazione Disco Ghiaccio Milano: 1936–1937.
Hockey Club Milano Inter: 1950–1956.

From 1937 to 1946 the club was disbanded by order of the FISC, and its players were part of the HC Diavoli Rossoneri Milano renamed as AC Milanese DG at that time.

Achievements

Italian Serie A Ice Hockey:
Winners (15) : 1925, 1926, 1927, 1930, 1931, 1933, 1934, 1937, 1947, 1948, 1950, 1951, 1952, 1954, 1955.
Spengler Cup:
Winners (2) : 1953, 1954.

Alpenliga teams
Defunct ice hockey teams in Italy
Ice hockey clubs established in 1924
Sports clubs disestablished in 1956
1924 establishments in Italy
1956 disestablishments in Italy
Sport in Milan